The Diocese of Arlington is a Latin Church ecclesiastical territory or diocese of the Catholic Church in the state of Virginia in the United States.  The diocese comprises 70 parishes across 21 counties and seven independent cities. The Diocese of Arlington is a suffragan diocese in the ecclesiastical province of the Archdiocese of Baltimore.

Bishop Michael F. Burbidge has been serving as bishop of the Diocese of Arlington since December 2016; he resides on the grounds of the Cathedral of Saint Thomas More in Arlington County, Virginia.  In 2013, the diocese had 256 priests and 453,916 registered Catholics. , the total population within the diocese, Catholic and non-Catholic, was 2,968,486.

Territory
The Diocese of Arlington is composed of 21 Northern Virginia counties and seven independent cities:

 Counties:
 Arlington
 Clarke
 Culpeper
 Fairfax
 Fauquier
 Frederick
 King George

 Lancaster
 Loudoun
 Madison
 Northumberland
 Orange
 Page
 Prince William

 Rappahannock
 Richmond
 Shenandoah
 Spotsylvania
 Stafford
 Warren
 Westmoreland

 Cities:
 Alexandria
 Fairfax
 Falls Church
 Fredericksburg
 Manassas
 Manassas Park
 Winchester

Mission churches 
The Diocese of Arlington operates two mission churches for the Diocese of San Juan de la Maguana in the Dominican Republic.  These are Bánica Mission Parish (St. Francis of Assisi Church) in Bánica and Pedro Santana Mission Parish in Pedro Santana.  

Both missions are overseen by the diocesan Office of the Propagation of the Faith.  The director of that office is currently Reverend Patrick L. Posey.

History

Early history 
Prior to the American Revolution, few Catholics lived in the British Colony of Virginia. In 1634, Father John Altham, a Jesuit companion of Father Andrew White, performed missionary work among the Native American tribes living on the south bank of the Potomac River. The colonial government of Virginia soon enacted stringent laws against the practice of Catholicism. During the late 17th century, the few Catholic settlers in northern Virginia, living near Aquia Creek, were attended by then Father John Carroll and other Jesuit missionaries from Maryland.With the passage in 1786 of the Virginia Statute for Religious Freedom, written by future US President Thomas Jefferson, Catholics were granted religious freedom in the new state of Virginia.

By 1776, the city of Alexandria had a log chapel with a resident Catholic priest.  Reverend John Thayer from Boston was stationed at the chapel in 1794. The Reverend Francis Neale erected a brick church in Alexandria in 1796 and replaced it with a larger one in 1811.  Fathers Anthony Kohlmann and future Bishop Bitenedict Fenwick frequently officiated at services in Alexandria.

Pope Pius VII erected the Diocese of Richmond on July 11, 1820.  It included Alexandria and the surrounding counties of northern Virginia.

Diocese of Arlington 
Pope Paul VI erected the Diocese of Arlington on May 28, 1974.  He removed its territory from the  Diocese of Richmond and made the new diocese a suffragan of the Archdiocese of Baltimore.The pope appointed Auxiliary Bishop Thomas Welsh of the Archdiocese of Philadelphia as the first bishop of Arlington.

During his tenure, Welsh established six new parishes and dedicated eleven new churches. He established the Office of Migration and Refugee Services in 1975 and the Family Life Bureau in 1977. He also started the diocesan newspaper, The Arlington Catholic Herald.Walsh was the founding president of the board of the Catholic Home Study Institute which became the Catholic Distance University. The number of Catholics in Arlington increased from 154,000 to 179,000 under his tenure. In 1983, Pope John Paul II appointed Welsh as bishop of the Diocese of Allentown.

To replace Welsh, John Paul II named Reverend John Keating of the Archdiocese of Chicago. Keating issued six pastoral letters and ordained 84 priests. In 1994, he made national headlines by refusing to allow female altar servers in the diocese.  When Keating died in 1998, the Diocese of Arlington had over 336,000 Catholics, 65 parishes, and five missions.

Bishop Paul Loverde of the Diocese of Ogdensburg became the third bishop of Arlington, named by John Paul II to the position in 1999.  Loverde reinstated the permanent diaconate program, and allowed seminarians to study at Blessed John XXIII National Seminary in Weston, Massachusetts,  the Pontifical College Josephinum in Columbus, Ohio, and the Catholic University of America.  He also supported religious orders coming into the diocese, such as the Franciscan Sisters of the Eucharist and the Cloistered Dominicans.In 2006, Loverde permitted female altar servers, at the discretion of the local pastors, for the first time. Loverde retired in 2016.

Pope Francis appointed Bishop Michael Burbidge from the Diocese of Raleigh as bishop of Arlington in 2016.  He is the current serving bishop of the diocese. On August 22, 2017, William Aitcheson, a priest in the diocese, admitted to being a member of the Ku Klux Klan while a college student in the 1970s.  Aitcheson also announced that he would temporarily step down from his post at St. Leo the Great Catholic Parish in Fairfax, Virginia. Burbidge released a statement referring to Aitcheson's past as "sad and deeply troubling" while hoping that his conversion of heart would inspire others.

On August 12, 2021, Burbidge released a pastoral letter in which he explained the church's stance on transgenderism and criticized the use of preferred gender pronouns when addressing transgender people.

In January 2022, Burbidge issued regulations for the diocese regarding Pope Francis' motu propio Traditionis custodes. He permitted celebration of the extraordinary form of the Mass to continue in 21 parishes, but he suspended the celebration of any "new celebrations of the Sacraments" in the extraordinary form.   In July 2022, a year following the publication of Traditionis custodes, he further restricted the extraordinary form in his diocese, allowing it only in eight parishes, and in five of those eight it may only be celebrated in a building other than the main church.

Sexual abuse
On June 20, 2012, a woman sued Bishop Loverde and the diocese, claiming that a diocesan priest, Thomas J. Euteneur, had sexually abused her on several occasions in 2008.  The defendant stated that Euteneur, under the guise of conducting an exorcism, had kissed and fondled her.  The woman said that Loverde and the diocese had allowed Euteneur to perform exorcisms.

On February 14, 2019, Bishop Burbidge released a list of sixteen diocesan priests who had been credibly accused of sexual abuse. In 2010, Reverend Felix Owino pled guilty to molesting an 11-year-old girl in Fairfax County. In 2011, Owino was given a nine-month prison sentence, a five-year suspended prison sentence and the chance of being deported back to his native country of Kenya. By 2018, Owino had been deported. 

In March 2020, Scott Asalone was arrested on charges of sexually abusing a teenager in Loudoun County, Virginia in 1985. He is a former priest who had previously served at Saint Francis de Sales Parish in Purcellville, Virginia.  In a public statement released that month, Washington D.C. councilman David Grosso identified himself as Asalone's victim.

Schools COVID -19 Pandemic Mask Mandate
On January 23, 2022, the Diocese of Arlington instructed its schools to follow Virginia's Republican Governor Glenn Youngkin’s anti-mask executive order for schools that was to go into effect on January 24.  In a letter to school leaders, Superintendent Joseph Vorbach said they should follow state requirements over local health guidance when masks became optional at the state level.  He added that Youngkin's executive order “is clear on the right of parents not to have their child be subject to a mask mandate.”

Bishops

Bishops of Arlington
 Thomas Jerome Welsh (1974–1983), appointed Bishop of Allentown
 John Richard Keating (1983–1998)
 Paul S. Loverde (1999–2016)
 Michael F. Burbidge (2016–present)

Other priest from the diocese who became bishop
 Antons Justs, appointed Bishop of Jelgava in 1995

Churches

Catholic colleges and universities
 Christendom College, Front Royal
 Divine Mercy University, Sterling
 Marymount University, Arlington

Catholic high schools
 Bishop Denis J. O'Connell High School, Arlington
 Bishop Ireton High School, Alexandria
 Saint Paul VI Catholic High School, Chantilly
 Saint John Paul the Great Catholic High School, Dumfries

Catholic Charities of the Diocese of Arlington
The diocese coordinates and supports a range of charitable activities focused on assistance to the vulnerable, fund-raising and education. Initiatives include counselling, prison visits and foster care. Archduchess Kathleen of Habsburg-Lorraine is a former communications director of the CCDA.

See also
 Historical list of the Catholic bishops of the United States
 List of the Catholic dioceses of the United States
 List of Roman Catholic archdioceses (by country and continent)
 List of Roman Catholic dioceses (alphabetical) (including archdioceses)
 List of Roman Catholic dioceses (structured view) (including archdioceses)

References

Sources
 Andreassi, Anthony D. (2002). Walking in Faith: the first 25 Years. A History of the Diocese of Arlington, Editions du Signe: Strasbourg. .
 2014 Catholic Diocese of Arlington Directory

External links
 
 The Catholic Herald - the official newspaper of the Catholic Diocese of Arlington
 Diocese of Arlington profile in Catholic-Hierarchy.org database

 
1974 establishments in Virginia
Catholic Church in Virginia
Christian organizations established in 1974
Arlington
Arlington
Arlington